Jason Davis (born 6 November 1984) is a Bermudian international footballer who plays for the North Village Rams, as a midfielder.

Club career
Davis played club football in Bermuda for Wolves before playing college soccer for CBU Capers. He played with North Village Rams during the 2011–12 season after joining them from Boulevard.

He was suspended for two games and handed a 12-month probation after a violent altercation with Dandy Town Hornets player Zaire Burchall in April 2014. The incident saw Hornets' goalkeeper Treadwell Gibbons being suspended from football for a stunning 5 years.

International career
He earned seven caps for Bermuda between 2007 and 2008, which included playing in one FIFA World Cup qualifying match in February 2008. He also appeared in 2008 Caribbean Championship qualification matches.

References

1984 births
Living people
Bermudian footballers
Bermuda international footballers
North Village Rams players
Bermudian expatriate footballers
Expatriate soccer players in Canada
Bermudian expatriate sportspeople in Canada
Association football midfielders